Felix Maria von Exner-Ewarten (23 August 1876 in Vienna – 7 February 1930, Vienna) was an Austrian meteorologist and geophysicist.

His son Christof Exner (1915–2007) was a professor of geology in Vienna.

Literature

External links 
 

Austrian knights
Austrian meteorologists
Austrian physicists
1876 births
1930 deaths